Squamellaria is a genus of myrmecophytic flowering plants in the family Rubiaceae. It is endemic to the islands of Fiji.

It is one of five ant-plant genera in the family Rubiaceae, the others being Anthorrhiza, Hydnophytum, Myrmecodia, and Myrmephytum.

Species
The following list of 4 species is sourced from The Plant List.

Squamellaria imberbis (A.Gray) Becc.
Squamellaria major A.C.Sm.	
Squamellaria thekii Jebb
Squamellaria wilsonii (Horne ex Baker) Becc.

References

Rubiaceae genera
Myrmecophytes
Taxa named by Odoardo Beccari
Psychotrieae